Eva Ngigi–Sarwari (née Eva Ngigi), is a Kenyan businesswoman. She is an executive  at Visa Inc., responsible for Kenya, Somalia & South Sudan, after joining in September 2020.

Early life
She was born in Kenya circa 1981. She graduated from Moi University in 2004, with a Bachelor of Business Management degree, majoring in Marketing. She earned a Master of Business Administration. She was awarded by the University of Nairobi in 2010. In 2019, she successfully undertook the Oxford Fintech Programme at Saïd Business School. Later the same year, she enrolled in the Emeritus Institute of Management (EMERITUS), graduating in 2020 with a Postgraduate Diploma in Digital Business.

Career
After her first degree, she went into banking. She spent five years at Cooperative Bank of Kenya, focusing on improving the bank's customer relationship and experience.

She then spent two years at CfC Stanbic Holdings (today Stanbic Holdings Plc), focusing on transaction products and services sales, as manager for that department. In 2012, Ngigi was hired by Standard Chartered Kenya and over seven years rose to the position of Head of Transaction Banking in the Commercial Banking Division. In January 2020, she took over Project Lead of SC Ventures, a new enterprise by Stanchart. She left Stanchart Kenya in September 2020.

In September 2020, she was appointed to her present position at Visa Inc. She oversees operations in Kenya, Somalia and South Sudan.

Family
She is a mother to two sons and one daughter.

See also
 Julia Carvalho

References

External links
 Visa appoints Eva Ngigi-Sarwari as Kenya's new country manager As of 11 September 2020.

Living people
1980 births
21st-century Kenyan businesswomen
21st-century Kenyan businesspeople
University of Nairobi alumni
Moi University alumni
Kenyan business executives